Puppy is a 2019 Indian Tamil-language comedy drama film written and directed by Nattu Dev (credited as Morattu Single) in his directorial debut. The film starring Varun in his debut as a lead actor, Samyuktha Hegde and Yogi Babu is produced by Ishari K. Ganesh under his production banner Vels Film International. The music for the film is composed by Dharan Kumar. The film had its theatrical release on 11 October 2019 and opened to negative reviews.

Plot 
Final year college student Prabhu has a strong urge to lose his virginity. His senior guides him. Prabhu falls in love with his classmate Ramya. His sexual curiosity lands him in trouble when he and Ramya have pre-marital sex. He gets biggest shock of his life when he learns that Ramya shows positive signs of pregnancy. His pet dog puppy is severely ill, which worries both Prabhu and Ramya. How will he fix the things forms crux of the story.

Cast 

 Varun as Prabhu
 Samyuktha Hegde as Ramya
 Yogi Babu as Senior
 Rajendran
 G. Marimuthu as Prabhu's father
 Nithya Ravindran as Prabhu's mother
 Anbarasan
 Risha
 R. S. Shivaji as doctor
 Tiger Thangadurai
Sampath Ram
 TSR in a special appearance

Soundtrack

References

External links

2010s Tamil-language films
Indian comedy-drama films
2019 comedy-drama films
2019 directorial debut films
2019 films
Films scored by Dharan Kumar